Pier Morten (born 15 February 1959) is a Canadian judoka and wrestler, and is the world's first deaf-blind black belt in Judo. Morten competed in seven Paralympic Games, four in Judo and three in Wrestling, and served as Canada's flag-bearer for the closing ceremony at the 2000 Paralympics.  He won bronze in Judo in the -65 kg category in 1988, 71 kg category in 1992, and -73 kg category in 2000, and silver in Wrestling in the -64 kg category in 1984.

Morten has won many awards for his achievements. He was named British Columbia's Disabled Athlete of the Year in 1987 for both Wrestling and Judo, and then again for Judo in 2000. In 1988, Morten became the first man  presented with the Whang Youn Dai Achievement Award for exemplifying the spirit of the Paralympic Games. He was also awarded Sport BC's Harry Jerome Comeback Award in 1998, and won the International Blind Sports Federation's Athlete of the Year Award in 2002. Morten was inducted into the Canadian Foundation for Physically Disabled Persons Hall of Fame in 1999, and the Judo Canada Hall of Fame in 2012.

Morten is the brother of fellow Paralympian Eddie Morten, and married to former wrestler and current documentary filmmaker Shelley Morten.

See also
Judo in British Columbia
Judo in Canada
List of Canadian judoka
Wrestling in Canada

References

External links

Video
Pier Morten shares his memories of the Canadian National Institute for the Deaf retreat on Bowen Island, British Columbia  (alertbayDeafboy on YouTube)

Canadian male judoka
1959 births
Living people
Wrestlers at the 1984 Summer Paralympics
Judoka at the 1988 Summer Paralympics
Judoka at the 1992 Summer Paralympics
Judoka at the 2000 Summer Paralympics
Paralympic judoka of Canada
Paralympic silver medalists for Canada
Paralympic bronze medalists for Canada
Medalists at the 1984 Summer Paralympics
Medalists at the 1988 Summer Paralympics
Medalists at the 1992 Summer Paralympics
Medalists at the 2000 Summer Paralympics
Paralympic medalists in judo
Canadian Disability Hall of Fame